The Shire of Ngaanyatjarraku is a remote local government area in Western Australia near the Northern Territory/South Australian border.

It was formed on 1 July 1993 following a report of the Local Government Boundaries Commission in 1992. The Shire of Wiluna was divided with the eastern area becoming the new Shire.

It is a community of interest within the traditional lands of the Ngaanyatjarra people of the Central Desert of Western Australia. The 99-year leases held by the Ngaanyatjarra Land Council on behalf of the traditional owners also form the boundaries of the Shire of Ngaanyatjarraku.

The Shire has  of gravel road and is far from bitumen roads.

Ngaanyatjarra is the first language of most residents (65%, see below) with the other language significantly represented being Pitjantjatjara.

Population
The 2021 ABS Census indicated that the region's 1,358 residents comprised 48.5% males and 51.5% females, with 84.5% of the population being Indigenous Australians. 
The Ngaanyatjarraku community has a greater proportion of younger people than the overall Australian population and a lesser proportion of older people, reflected by the median age of 30 years of age compared with 38 Australia-wide.

Some other statistics:
 84.5% of the population identify as Aboriginal Australian 
 71.4% (970) speak Ngaanyatjarra at home
 9.9% speak English only at home (cf 72.0% nationwide)

Communities and localities
There are 10 small local centres within the Ngaanyatyarra Lands.

The communities and localities of the Shire of Ngaanyatjarraku with population and size figures based on the most recent Australian census:

Kiwirrkurra and Yilka (Cosmo Newbery) lie outside the Lands, but are served by the Shire.

Giles Weather Station is also within the Shire.

Council statistics
Location: Gibson / Great Victoria Deserts
Length of Sealed Roads (km): 12.6
Length of Unsealed Roads (km): 1,444
Population: 1,335 (2006 Census)
Educational Institutions      	
Colleges 1
Primary & High Schools (K −10) 8

Ngaanyatjarra Council (Aboriginal Corporation)
The associated Ngaanyatjarra Council operates 
Air services (contracted to Missionary Aviation Fellowship (MAF))
 Tertiary education (Ngaanyatjarra Community College, Warburton)
Communities
Land Management
 Native Title Representative Body
Ngaanyatjarra Agencies and Transport Services Inc (NATS)
Ngaanyatjarra Services (Aboriginal Corporation)
Roadhouses
Tjukayirla
Warakurna
Warburton
Service Stations
 Caltex Alice Springs fuel franchise supplies Caltex fuel and petroleum products to all Ngaanyatjarra communities, workshops and roadhouse facilities at a fair price, and operates the Caltex fuel dealership throughout Central Australia.
Caltex Roadhouse – Alice Springs

Heritage-listed places

As of 2023, two places are heritage-listed in the Shire of Ngaanyatjarraku, the Giles Meteorological Station and the Warakurna Multi-Function Police Facility, neither of which are on the State Register of Heritage Places.

References

External links

Ngaanyatjarraku, Shire of
Aboriginal communities in Goldfields-Esperance